Sonnet 48 is one of 154 sonnets written by the English playwright and poet William Shakespeare. It is a member of the Fair Youth sequence, in which the poet expresses his love towards a young man.

Structure
Sonnet 48 is an English or Shakespearean sonnet, a type of sonnet that contains three quatrains followed by a final rhyming couplet. It follows the form's typical rhyme scheme, ABAB CDCD EFEF GG, and is written in iambic pentameter based on five pairs of metrically weak/strong syllabic positions per line. The second line exemplifies a regular iambic pentameter:

×      / ×  /  ×    /×    /    ×    / 
Each trifle under truest bars to thrust, (48.2)
/ = ictus, a metrically strong syllabic position. × = nonictus.

Notes

Further reading

External links
Analysis

British poems
Sonnets by William Shakespeare